Pierarova, is a khutor in Pruzhany District of Brest Region in Belarus part of Shereshyovskiy Rural Settlement.

History
During the period of the Russian Empire existence it was part of Belovezhskaya-Alexandrovskaya Volost of Pruzhansky Uyezd of Grodno Governorate. At the beginning of the 20th century, the settlement included 15 inhabitants. In 1921-1939 it was a part of Poland. In September 1939 following the Invasion of the Soviet Union to Poland, the village, together with the surrounding territories was incorporated to the Byelorussian Soviet Socialist Republic, from January 15, 1940, in Sharashovsky, from December 17, 1956, in the Pruzhany District of the Brest Region. In 1970 the settlement 16 inhabitants. By 1999 the number increased to 34. In 2005 it consisted 6 inhabitants and 2 yards while by 2010 it had 29 inhabitants. On May 29, 2015, the Sharashevsky village council, which included the farm, was transformed into a village council.

References

Villages in Belarus
Pruzhansky Uyezd
Białystok Voivodeship (1919–1939)
Belastok Region
Białowieża Forest
Belarus–Poland border crossings
Populated places in Brest Region